Buck (stylized in all caps) is a company of directors, producers, creative technologists, digital artists, graphic designers, illustrators, and animators creating media for advertising, technology, and entertainment clients. Buck's offices are in Los Angeles, New York, Sydney, and Amsterdam.

History

Founding 
Buck was founded in 2004 by Jeff Ellermeyer, Ryan Honey, and Orion Tait in Los Angeles as a motion graphics and animation company. In 2006, they opened their second office in New York, headed by Tait. Their next office opened in Sydney, Australia in 2015. They opened their newest office in Amsterdam, Netherlands in 2021. Currently, Honey and Tait act as Co-CCO's, and Ellermeyer is CEO.

Name 
Buck's name is inspired by Buckminster Fuller.

Awards

References

External links
 

American companies established in 2000
Mass media companies established in 2000